Lend Me Your Husband is a 1924 American silent drama film directed by Christy Cabanne and starring Doris Kenyon, David Powell, and Dolores Cassinelli.

Synopsis
A fast living society girl is engaged to be married, but becomes involved with a married man with a bad reputation. Unknown to her, he is also having an affair with her friend.

Cast

References

Bibliography
 Munden, Kenneth White. The American Film Institute Catalog of Motion Pictures Produced in the United States, Part 1. University of California Press, 1997.

External links
 

1924 films
1924 drama films
1920s English-language films
American silent feature films
Silent American drama films
Films directed by Christy Cabanne
Associated Exhibitors films
1920s American films